Edward Vosburgh (November 18, 1864 – September 24, 1930) was an American businessman and politician from New York.

Life 
Vosburgh was born on November 18, 1864 in Johnstown, New York, the son of Henry J. Vosburgh and Charlotte Putnam.

In 1885, Vosburgh moved to Vail Mills, where he opened a general store with David B. Hall. He bought Hall's interest a year later and continued running the store. He later sold it to C. D. Stewart of Gloversville, at which point he moved with his family to Broadalbin. He served as Vail Mills postmaster from 1886 to 1909, with an interruption from 1896 to 1900 when a Democratic administration appointed someone else instead. He was also a member of the Trust Company of Fulton County for many years.

Vosburgh was town supervisor for Mayfield from 1898 to 1900. In 1909, Vosburgh was elected to the New York State Assembly as a Republican, representing Fulton and Hamilton Counties. He served in the Assembly in 1910. During World War I, Governor Charles Seymour Whitman appointed him a member of the local exemption board for the second district of Fulton County.

In 1886, Vosburgh married Jennie Atty. Their son, Ralph E., helped his father manage the store and became postmaster of Vail Mills. He was a member of the Methodist Episcopal church. He was a Freemason.

Vosburgh died in Amsterdam City Hospital on September 24, 1930. He was buried in Broadalbin cemetery.

References

External links 

 The Political Graveyard
 Edward Vosburgh at Find a Grave

1864 births
1930 deaths
People from Johnstown, New York
People from Broadalbin, New York
Businesspeople from New York (state)
American merchants
19th-century American businesspeople
New York (state) postmasters
Town supervisors in New York (state)
20th-century American politicians
Republican Party members of the New York State Assembly
Members of the Methodist Episcopal Church
American Freemasons
Burials in New York (state)